The 1978 Nobel Prize in Literature was awarded to the Polish-born American Jewish writer Isaac Bashevis Singer (1902–1991) "for his impassioned narrative art which, with roots in a Polish-Jewish cultural tradition, brings universal human conditions to life." He wrote prolifically in Yiddish and later translated his own works into English with the help of editors and collaborators.

Laureate

Isaac Bashevis Singer's Jewish upbringing and experience in the holocaust plays a significant role in his rich body of work that includes about 20 novels and several books for children. His literary debut started with first published story "Oyf der elter" ("In Old Age", 1925) which won the literary competition of the Literarishe Bletter, where he worked as a proofreader. His tales frequently span several generations, and many of them discuss how assimilation, secularism, and modernism have an impact on the family as in The Family Moskat (1950), The Manor (1967) and The Estate (1969). Jewish folklore and legends are frequently featured in his stories such as Zlateh the Goat and Other Stories (1966) and The Golem (1969). Several of the Singers' works have been adapted for film. Among his famous works also include Satan in Goray (1933), The Magician of Lublin (1971), and Enemies, A Love Story (1966)

References

External links
 Presentation Speech by Professor Lars Gyllensten nobelprize.org

Isaac Bashevis Singer
1978